This is a list of all present sovereign states in Africa and their predecessors. The region of Africa is generally defined geographically to include the subregions of African continent, Madagascar island, Mauritius Island and several minor islands, and their respective sovereign states. 
Africa was originally colonised by Europeans with Southern Africa  primarily by the British, and the West Africa and North Africa primarily by the British, French, Spanish and Portuguese. Today, Africa consists of 54 sovereign states of various government types, the most common consisting of parliamentary systems.

See also
List of sovereign states and dependent territories in Africa
Decolonisation of Africa
Succession of states

References

Africa-related lists
Former countries in Africa
History of Africa
Africa